The Roanoke Shops (also called the East End Shops) is a Norfolk Southern workshop and maintenance facility in Roanoke, Virginia. Between 1884 and 1953, the shops produced 447 steam locomotives, all for the Norfolk & Western Railway (N&W). The Roanoke Locomotive Shops famous known steam locomotives preserved were Norfolk and Western 611, a N&W Class J 4-8-4 "Northern" built in 1950, Norfolk and Western 1218, an articulated N&W Class A 2-6-6-4 built in 1943, and Norfolk and Western 2156, an articulated Class Y6A 2-8-8-2 built in 1942.

History
Before the shops were being built, Roanoke had been the sleepy farming community of Big Lick and a small stop on the Atlantic, Mississippi & Ohio Railroad (AM&O). That changed in February 1881 when the owners of the Shenandoah Valley Railroad, building up the valley, purchased the AM&O, renamed it the Norfolk and Western, and selected Big Lick as the new junction. In 1882, the town grew rapidly as the new center of the combined railroads and changed its name to Roanoke, becoming a city in just a short time.

In October 1881, the Roanoke Machine Works was founded, a set of shops that would grow to massive size and become the major employer in the Roanoke Valley for a century. The shops came under the control of the N&W in 1883, and the following year the shops began building locomotives. Over the next nine years, the facility built 152 locomotives, all for the N&W, then suspended production. Antoine Sauter was one of its foremen.

Production resumed in 1900 at the facility, which had been renamed the Roanoke Shops in 1897. Over the next 53 years, the shops built 295 locomotives (and re-boilered two more). From 1927 to 1952, the shops built every steam locomotive acquired by the N&W.

During the 1930s, they employed over 6,000 workers, who were working on four steam locomotives and 20 freight cars on any given day. Products included locomotives of all sizes and of increasingly better technology, from switching engines to the famed streamlined J-class passenger locomotives, the huge, articulated Y5 and Y6-classes for low-speed coal drags, and the A-class for fast freight service.

In late 1953, the shop built its last locomotive, the S1a-class No. 244, which was also the last steam locomotive manufactured in the United States for domestic use.

After the N&W stopped using steam locomotives in May 1960, J-class No. 611 and A-class No. 1218 were used to pull excursion trains from the early 1980s until the early 1990s. No. 1218 is now on display near its birthplace in a specially constructed pavilion at the Virginia Museum of Transportation in downtown Roanoke. No. 611 has been restored to operating condition for excursion service again in 2015. On May 18, 2020, Norfolk Southern shut down the locomotive shops and moved all operations to the Juniata Locomotive Shops in Altoona, Pennsylvania.

References

External links

Further reading
 

Railway buildings and structures in Virginia
Norfolk Southern Railway
Norfolk and Western Railway
History of Virginia
Buildings and structures in Roanoke, Virginia
Railway workshops in the United States
Industrial buildings and structures in Virginia
2020 disestablishments in Virginia